Gavgir-e Chamdaneh (also Romanized as Gāvgīr-e Chamdāneh; also known as Gāvgīr-e Jahrāneh) is a village in Kashkan Rural District, Shahivand District, Dowreh County, Lorestan Province, Iran. At the 2006 census, its population was 415, in 78 families.

References 

Towns and villages in Dowreh County